There are two forts named Udayagiri Fort in South India.

Fort in Udayagiri, Andhra Pradesh
Udayagiri Fort in Andhra Pradesh was constructed by Langula Gajapathi, chieftain to Gajapatis of Odisha approximately between 1434 and 1512 CE.

Fort in Tamil Nadu (Kanyakumari District)

Location

This was the most important military barracks of the rulers, when Padmanabhapuram was their capital.

History
Originally built in the 17th century, the fort was rebuilt by Maharaja Marthanda Varma of Travancore in the 18th century.

The fort contains an old foundry which was used for casting guns.

The fort was rebuilt during the reign of Marthanda Varma, between 1741-44 under the supervision of Eustachius De Lannoy, a Flemish naval commander of the Dutch East India Company, who later served as the Chief of the Travancore Army.

In the early days, the fort was of strategic importance.  Prisoners captured in the campaign against Tippu Sultan were confined in the fort for some time.  In 1810, the East India Company's Army under Colonel Leger marched into Travancore through the Aramboly Pass (Aralvaimozhi) to quell a rebellion under the leadership of Velu Thambi Dalava.

In later years, English East India Company troops were stationed at the fort until the middle of the 19th century. A foundry for the manufacture of guns, mortars, and cannonballs was established within the fort under the supervision of the resident General.

Architecture

The fort is built of massive granite blocks around an isolated hillock.

The tombs of the Dutch Admiral Eustachius De Lannoy, (in whose honour the fort was once called Dillanai Kottai— De Lennoy's Fort), and of his wife and son can still be found inside a partly ruined chapel in the fort.

De Lannoy's body was buried within the fort and a chapel was built at his burial site.  De Lannoy's tombstone lies within the walls of the ruined chapel. The inscriptions on his stone are both in Tamil and in Latin.  His wife and son were buried by his side.

Recently, officials of the Department of Archaeology found a tunnel within the fort.

Presently, the fort has been turned into a bio-diversity park by the Tamil Nadu forest department, with sites of historical importance, such as De Lannoy's tomb, remaining as protected archaeological sites under the Archaeological Department of India.

References

External links

 Official website of Kanyakumari

History of Kerala
Kanyakumari
Forts in Tamil Nadu